Kim Sang-guk (born 1 December 1934) is a South Korean gymnast. He competed in seven events at the 1960 Summer Olympics.

References

1934 births
Living people
South Korean male artistic gymnasts
Olympic gymnasts of South Korea
Gymnasts at the 1960 Summer Olympics
Gymnasts from Seoul